Old Enough to Be Her Grandpa is a 1914 American silent short comedy film directed by Tom Ricketts starring Charlotte Burton and William Garwood.

Cast
Charlotte Burton as Lilyan DeVoe
William Garwood as Rollie, his grandson
Jack Richardson as Stephen Barnard
Vivian Rich as Lora
Harry Van Meter

External links

1914 films
1914 comedy films
Silent American comedy films
American silent short films
American black-and-white films
1914 short films
American comedy short films
Films directed by Tom Ricketts
1910s American films